Torca Airport,  is an airport serving the Laguna Torca National Reserve, and Llico, a Pacific coastal village in the Maule Region of Chile.

The airport sits east of the village, between Laguna Torca and Vichuquén Lake (es). There are hills and rising terrain in all quadrants. Approach and departure from either end are over the lakes.

See also

Transport in Chile
List of airports in Chile

References

External links
OpenStreetMap - Torca
OurAirports - Torca
FallingRain - Torca Airport

Airports in Chile
Airports in Maule Region